"I'll Be There" is a song by English singer Emma Bunton from her second solo studio album, Free Me (2004). The song was written by Bunton, Hélène Muddiman and Mike Peden, and produced by the latter. It was released on 26 January 2004 as the album's third single. The single debuted and peaked at number seven on the UK Singles Chart. A black-and-white music video for "I'll Be There" was directed by Giuseppe Capotondi and shot in Paris.

Track listings
 UK CD 1
 "I'll Be There"  – 3:23
 "Takin' It Easy" – 3:58
 "I'll Be There"  – 5:39
 "I'll Be There"  – 6:58
 "I'll Be There"  – 3:23

 UK CD 2
 "I'll Be There" – 3:23
 "So Long" – 3:53

Credits and personnel
Credits adapted from the liner notes of Free Me.

 Emma Bunton – vocals, songwriting
 Richard Dowling – mastering
 Martin Hayles – keyboards, recording
 Nick Ingman – orchestra arrangement, orchestra conducting
 Isobel Griffiths Ltd – orchestra contractor
 Hélène Muddiman – backing vocals, songwriting
 Mike Peden – keyboards, mixing, production, songwriting
 Charlie Russell – live drums, programming
 Gavyn Wright – orchestra leader

Charts

Weekly charts

Year-end charts

Release history

References

19 Recordings singles
2003 songs
2004 singles
Black-and-white music videos
Emma Bunton songs
Music videos directed by Giuseppe Capotondi
Songs written by Emma Bunton
Songs written by Mike Peden
Universal Records singles